Hugh O'Leary (born 1974) is an English accountant. He is the husband of Liz Truss, who was prime minister of the United Kingdom from September to October 2022.

Early life and education
O'Leary was born in Allerton, Liverpool, and raised in Heswall, in Wirral, as the eldest of three siblings. O'Leary's mother Susan was a nurse, and his father John was a college lecturer who trained as a solicitor and worked for the legal firm of the Liverpool lawyer Rex Makin.

O'Leary attended Birkenhead School, where he studied Mathematics and Further Mathematics at A-level, applying unsuccessfully to the University of Oxford to study Philosophy, politics and economics. He went on to study econometrics and mathematical economics at the London School of Economics before becoming an accountant. Whilst at university, he was acquainted with Thérèse Coffey, who was later Liz Truss' Deputy Prime Minister.

Career
O'Leary worked as a finance director at Affinity Global Real Estate.

O’Leary worked at Arrakis Investments Limited, a company that, at the time, had no employees other than its one director.

Politics

O'Leary has stood unsuccessfully for the Conservative Party in local elections to Greenwich London Borough Council on several occasions. At the 1998 council election, he was a candidate for the Labour-held St Alfege ward. At the subsequent council election in 2002, he stood in Greenwich West; all three seats were won by the Labour Party.

His most recent candidacy to date was at the 2006 Greenwich election, this time in the Charlton ward, when O'Leary and the other opposition parties finished a considerable margin behind the winning Labour candidates. At this election, his wife Liz Truss was elected to Eltham South ward, which she represented until 2010. O'Leary has remained active in politics as a member of the Conservatives, canvassing with the party in Greenwich in 2022.

Personal life
O'Leary met Truss at the 1997 Conservative Party conference in Blackpool. The couple's first date was spent ice-skating, during which O'Leary sprained his ankle. O'Leary and Truss married in 2000; they live in Greenwich, south-east London, and the South West Norfolk constituency which Truss has represented since 2010. He stayed with Truss following her extramarital affair with Conservative MP Mark Field. The couple have two daughters.

References

External links

Living people

1974 births
Conservative Party (UK) people
English accountants
English people of Irish descent
People from Liverpool
Alumni of the London School of Economics
Spouses of prime ministers of the United Kingdom
21st-century English businesspeople
Truss family